The National Junior College Athletic Association (NJCAA) Men's Division II Basketball Championships consists of sixteen teams playing over a five-day period (Wednesday through Saturday) in March to determine a National Champion.

About the tournament 

Teams qualify for the tournament by first winning their district/region championships. The NJCAA Division II Men's Basketball Committee then seeds the top eight teams and uses a blind draw to place the remaining eight teams. When choosing the top eight seeds for the tournament, the three criteria that are considered by the committee are the national poll, the coaches' rankings, and each team's history.

Since 1994, Danville Area Community College has hosted the tournament in the Mary Miller Gymnasium.

Past results

See also 
List of Division 2 NJCAA schools
NJCAA Men's Division I Basketball Championship
NJCAA Men's Division III Basketball Championship
NJCAA Women's Basketball Championship

References 

Basketball, Men's Division II